Hollerith is a surname. Notable people with the surname include:

Herman Hollerith (1860–1929), German-American statistician, inventor, and businessman
Herman Hollerith IV (born 1955), American Episcopal bishop
Randolph Hollerith (born 1963), American Episcopal priest